Dinis Costa Lima Almeida (born 28 June 1995) is a Portuguese professional footballer who plays for Bulgarian club Ludogorets Razgrad as a central defender.

Club career
Born in Esposende, Braga District, Almeida finished his development at Varzim SC. His senior debut occurred in 2013–14, as he scored a career-best seven goals to help G.D. Joane finish fifth in the regular season third division but eventually being relegated.

Almeida then spent two years in the Spanish Segunda División B, with CF Reus Deportiu. In the summer of 2016 he signed with AS Monaco FC, being immediately loaned to C.F. Os Belenenses of Portugal's Primeira Liga. He made his debut in the competition on 27 August, coming on as a 46th-minute substitute in a 1–0 away win against C.D. Tondela. His first and only goal arrived in his fourth appearance, helping the visitors to a 3–1 away defeat of Sporting CP.

On 31 August 2017, still owned by Monaco, Almeida was loaned to S.C. Braga, being assigned to their reserves in the Segunda Liga. He signed with Xanthi F.C. on loan for the following campaign. He scored his first goal for the Greek club on 17 February 2019 in a 1–1 draw away to Athlitiki Enosi Larissa FC.

Almeida spent the following seasons also abroad, with PFC Lokomotiv Plovdiv (winning the Bulgarian Cup in 2019–20 after a penalty shootout defeat of PFC CSKA Sofia, where he converted his attempt) and Royal Antwerp FC (Belgian First Division A).

In the beginning of 2023, Almeida returned to Bulgaria to sign with Ludogorets Razgrad. Only few days later, during the winter training camp, Almeida received received serious injury sending him out until end of season.

Honours
Lokomotiv Plovdiv
Bulgarian Cup: 2019–20
Bulgarian Supercup: 2020

References

External links

National team data 

1995 births
Living people
People from Esposende
Sportspeople from Braga District
Portuguese footballers
Association football defenders
Primeira Liga players
Liga Portugal 2 players
Campeonato de Portugal (league) players
G.D. Joane players
C.F. Os Belenenses players
S.C. Braga B players
Segunda División B players
CF Reus Deportiu players
AS Monaco FC players
Super League Greece players
Xanthi F.C. players
First Professional Football League (Bulgaria) players
PFC Lokomotiv Plovdiv players
Belgian Pro League players
Royal Antwerp F.C. players
PFC Ludogorets Razgrad players
Portugal youth international footballers
Portuguese expatriate footballers
Expatriate footballers in Spain
Expatriate footballers in Greece
Expatriate footballers in Bulgaria
Expatriate footballers in Belgium
Portuguese expatriate sportspeople in Spain
Portuguese expatriate sportspeople in Greece
Portuguese expatriate sportspeople in Bulgaria
Portuguese expatriate sportspeople in Belgium